Ruhango is a town and capital of the Ruhango District in Southern Province, Rwanda.

References 

Populated places in Rwanda
Southern Province, Rwanda